"T" Is for Trespass is the 20th novel in Sue Grafton's "Alphabet" series of mystery novels and features Kinsey Millhone, a private eye based in the fictional Santa Teresa, California.

Plot summary

Kinsey's cantankerous neighbor Gus is badly injured in a fall and hires Solana Rojas, a private nurse, to help him while he recuperates. Kinsey becomes suspicious when Gus becomes isolated and withdrawn. She finds out that Solana is a con artist who  engages in identity theft.  What Kinsey does not know is that Solana is a dangerous sociopath with an accomplice and a history of clients who died under her care.  Kinsey works with other neighbors and friends to rescue Gus and expose the con-artist without rousing her suspicions.
 
At the same time, Kinsey investigates a case of possible insurance fraud involving a student who drove into another car. The female passenger in the other car had extensive injuries and she and her husband are suing the student and the insurance company. Kinsey must track down a reluctant witness and use her rather rough charm to get him to come forward.
 
Unlike previous books in this series, this book alternates between two perspectives: that of Kinsey and that of Solana.

Characters
Kinsey Millhone: Private detective who is concerned about her neighbor since private nurse Solana is hired to care for him, and takes on a case of insurance fraud.
Solana Rojas: The sociopath and con-artist who is "taking care" of Gus as his private nurse.

Reviews

References

External links
Sue Grafton Alphabet Series official site

Novels by Sue Grafton
Kinsey Millhone novels
2007 American novels
Novels set in California
G. P. Putnam's Sons books
Identity theft in popular culture